Albi Doka (born 26 June 1997) is an Albanian professional footballer who plays as a right back for Hungarian club Budapest Honvéd and the Albania national team.

Club career

Early career
Doka started his youth career at KF Tirana local academy Xheraldina, playing principally with under-15 side. In 2013 he moved at KF Tirana Academies to play for under-17 team.

Tirana
Doka was promoted to Tirana senior team at the start of 2017. On 5 February 2017 Doka made his Kategoria Superiore debut playing the full 90 minutes match against Laçi in a 1–0 loss. He played in an Albanian Cup match against Kukësi helping his team winning 2–1.

Honvéd
On 11 February 2022, Doka joined Budapest Honvéd in Hungary on loan. Honvéd made the transfer permanent in June 2022.

International career

Albania U21

2019 UEFA European Under-21 Championship qualification
Following an impressive season with Tirana for being an undisputed starter, Doka received his first international call up at the Albania national under-21 football team by coach Alban Bushi for the Friendly match against France U21 on 5 June 2017 and the 2019 UEFA European Under-21 Championship qualification opening match against Estonia U21 on 12 June 2017. He made his competitive debut for Albania U21 against Estonia U21 on 12 June 2017 playing the full 90-minutes match in a goalless draw.

Albania national team 
Doka made his international debut for Albania on 11 November 2020 in a friendly match against Kosovo.

Career statistics

Club

Honours

Club
Tirana
 Kategoria Superiore: 2019–20
 Albanian Cup: 2016–17
 Albanian Supercup: 2017
 Kategoria e Parë : Winner Group B
 Kategoria e Parë : 2017-2018

References

External links

1998 births
Living people
Footballers from Tirana
Albanian footballers
Albania international footballers
Albania youth international footballers
Albania under-21 international footballers
Association football fullbacks
Kategoria Superiore players
Croatian Football League players
Nemzeti Bajnokság I players
KF Tirana players
HNK Gorica players
Budapest Honvéd FC players
Albanian expatriate footballers
Expatriate footballers in Croatia
Expatriate footballers in Hungary
Albanian expatriate sportspeople in Croatia
Albanian expatriate sportspeople in Hungary